James Earl “Trey” Pipkins III (born September 5, 1996) is an American football offensive tackle for the Los Angeles Chargers of the National Football League (NFL). He played college football at Sioux Falls.

Professional career

Pipkins was drafted by the Los Angeles Chargers in the third round (91st overall) of the 2019 NFL Draft.

Pipkins was placed on the reserve/COVID-19 list by the Chargers on October 30, 2020, and was activated the next day. He was placed back on the COVID-19 list on December 8, and activated again on December 21.

Pipkins was named the Chargers starting right tackle for the 2022 season, and started 14 games.

On March 14, 2023, Pipkins signed a three-year contract extension with the Chargers.

References

External links
Sioux Falls Cougars bio

1996 births
Living people
American football offensive linemen
Los Angeles Chargers players
People from Apple Valley, Minnesota
Players of American football from Minnesota
Sioux Falls Cougars football players
Sportspeople from the Minneapolis–Saint Paul metropolitan area
Apple Valley High School (Minnesota) alumni